The E-class submarines were a class of two United States Navy submarines, built by the Fore River Shipbuilding Company of Quincy, Massachusetts, under a subcontract from the Electric Boat Company. They were used as coastal and harbor defense submarines prior to World War I. When hostilities broke out, the E class were mostly used as training boats; however, E-1 operated on war patrols based in the Azores. During this time, the need for an improved permanent bridge structure was discovered; the temporary piping-and-canvas bridges were inadequate in the North Atlantic.

Design
Unusually for the early submarine era, the E class boats displaced no more than the 340 tons of the preceding class. The E class was the first US diesel-powered submarine. The French "Z" (Q 36) was the first in the world, in 1905. Although early diesels were unreliable and the E class engines were replaced in 1915, diesels rapidly supplanted gasoline-fueled engines aboard submarines worldwide, to eliminate the substantial risk of gasoline fumes settling into the bilges of the boat at explosive concentrations. Another innovation that became standard was bow planes for greater precision in depth control.

These vessels included some features intended to increase underwater speed that were standard on US submarines of this era, including a small sail and a rotating cap over the torpedo tube muzzles. 
The streamlined, rotating torpedo tube muzzle cap reduced the drag that an uncovered tube would otherwise cause. In the stowed position, the submarine appeared to have no torpedo tubes, as the holes in the cap were covered by the bow stem.  This feature remained standard through the K class, after which it was replaced with shutters that were standard through the 1950s.
For extended surface runs, the small sail intended for greater speed underwater was augmented with the temporary piping-and-canvas structure apparent in the photo.  The considerable time required to dismantle that structure made "crash" diving the boat impossible, and that impediment remained until its removal with the inception of the N class, commissioned 1917-1918. Experience in World War I showed that this was inadequate in North Atlantic weather, and earlier submarines serving overseas in that war (E class through L class) had the forward structure of the bridge modified with a "chariot" shield. Starting with the N class, built with lessons learned from overseas experience, US submarines had bridges more suited to surfaced operations in rough weather.

History
The E class and similar early submarines were known as "pig boats", or "boats", due to foul living quarters and unusual hull shape. The E class was used to test and evaluate tactics and new equipment, but was quickly overtaken by newer long-range, ocean-going submarines. E-1 was forward deployed to the Azores in World War I, the oldest and smallest US submarine to perform war patrols in that war. The class was decommissioned and scrapped in 1922 to comply with the Washington Naval Treaty.

Boats 
  was laid down on 22 December 1909, launched on 27 May 1911 as Skipjack and was commissioned on 14 February 1912 (LT Chester W. Nimitz in command). Renamed E-1 on 17 November 1911 and reclassified as SS-24 on 17 July 1920, the submarine was decommissioned on 20 October 1921 and sold afterwards.
  was laid down on 22 December 1909, launched on 16 June 1911 as Sturgeon and was commissioned on 14 February 1912. Renamed E-2 on 17 November 1911 and reclassified as SS-24 on 17 July 1920, the submarine was decommissioned on 20 October 1921 and sold afterwards.

References

Notes

Sources
 Friedman, Norman "US Submarines through 1945: An Illustrated Design History", Naval Institute Press, Annapolis:1995, .
 Gardiner, Robert, Conway's All the World's Fighting Ships 1906–1921 Conway Maritime Press, 1985. .
 Hutchison, Robert. Submarines, War Beneath The Waves, From 1776 To The Present Day.
Navsource.org early diesel submarines page
Pigboats.com E-boats page

External links

Submarine classes
 
 E class